Avon High School (AHS) is a 4-year high school in Avon, Hendricks County, Indiana.

Demographics
The demographic breakdown of the 2,874 students enrolled for the 2015-2016 school year was:
Male - 50.6%
Female - 49.4%
Native American/Alaskan - 0.1%
Asian/Pacific islanders - 4.6%
Black - 12.0%
Hispanic - 6.9%
White - 71.4%
Multiracial - 5.0%

23.2% of the students were eligible for free or reduced-cost lunch.

Athletics
Avon's Orioles are members of the Hoosier Crossroads Conference.  The school colors are black and gold.  The following Indiana High School Athletic Association (IHSAA) sanctioned sports are offered:

Baseball (boys)
Basketball (girls and boys)
Cross country (girls and boys)
Football (boys)
Golf (girls and boys)
Boys state champions - 2009
Soccer (girls and boys)
Girls state champions - 2013
Softball (girls)
State champions - 2016
Swimming (girls and boys)
Tennis (girls and boys)
Track and Field (girls and boys)
Boys state champions - 2018
Unified track (coed)
Wrestling (boys)
Volleyball (girls)
State champions - 2012, 2013, 2017

Performing arts
Avon has a marching band, an orchestra, choirs, show choirs, a dance team and a theatre program.

The marching band won the Indiana State School Music Association (ISSMA) tournament in 2001-2007, 2009, 2010, 2013-2014, 2019 and 2021.  In 2008, 2009, and 2010, they placed first in the Bands of America Grand National Championships.  They were in the 2012 New Year's Day Rose Parade in Pasadena, California.

Notable alumni
 Steve Talley - actor
 Patrick Rodgers - PGA Tour golfer
  Brandon Peters - NCAA D1 Quarterback for University of Michigan and University of Illinois

See also
 List of high schools in Indiana

References

External links
 
 Avon Community School Corporation
 School snapshot from Indiana Department of Education

Public high schools in Indiana
Schools in Hendricks County, Indiana